Dorinda Rose Cox (born 25 May 1976) is an Australian politician and a Yamatji–Noongar woman. She is the first Indigenous woman to represent Western Australia in the Senate. In 2020 she won preselection as the Australian Greens' lead Senate candidate in Western Australia, and the following year she was appointed to fill the casual vacancy caused by the resignation of Senator Rachel Siewert. Dorinda Cox was then elected as the Australian Greens Senator for Western Australia at the 2022 Federal Election.

Early life
Cox was born in Kojonup, Western Australia, to Yamatji and Noongar (Kaniyang and Yued) parents. Her family has experienced "five generations of child removal in her matriarchal line". Her grandfather was taken from his family and country in the Gascoyne as an infant to be raised at the New Norcia mission, where his name was changed.

Cox grew up in Perth, leaving school in 1994 at the age of 17 to become a cadet with the Western Australia Police. Cox was a police cadet from 1994–1996 and an Aboriginal Police Liaison Officer from 1996–2002, where she conducted specialised training in child abuse, sexual assault interviewing and frontline policing, including the family violence unit. She left the force at the age of 27 to work for Centrelink. In 2008, Cox was appointed to the Rudd Government's National Council to Reduce Violence Against Women. She has also served on the board of anti-violence organisation Our Watch, on the WA Ombudsman's Advisory Committee on Child Death Reviews and Family Violence Homicides, and on the Indigenous working group for the Every Woman Treaty campaign. Cox has produced extensive research outlining strategies for working closely with First Nations survivors of sexual assault. As of 2019, Cox was the acting executive officer of the Noongar Family Safety and Wellbeing Council. She is a former non-executive director of the Kooraminning Aboriginal Corporation based in Narrogin.

Politics
Cox stood for the Greens at the 2017 Western Australian state election in the seat of Jandakot. She was also the party's candidate at the 2018 Fremantle federal by-election.

In October 2020, Cox won preselection as the lead candidate on the Greens' Senate ticket in Western Australia at the 2022 federal election, following the decision of incumbent senator Rachel Siewert not to re-contest. She defeated former state MP Lynn MacLaren and incumbent state director Sophie Greer in the preselection ballot. Siewert chose to resign from the Senate prior to the end of her term, creating a casual vacancy to be filled by Cox in September 2021. She would be the first Indigenous woman to represent Western Australia in the Senate and the fifth in federal Parliament.

Cox was sworn in to the Senate on 18 October 2021. Senator Cox took her maiden speech as an opportunity to shine a light on First Nations issues, including cultural heritage, rates of homelessness, deaths in custody, Treaty and family violence.

In her first speech to the Senate, Cox also called for a national inquiry into missing and murdered First Nations women. In November 2021, Cox secured the support of the Senate to establish a parliamentary inquiry which will examine the policing processes used in First Nations murder and missing persons investigations.

Cox is the Australian Greens Spokesperson on Mining and Resources, Trade, Tourism, Science, Research and Innovation.

Political positions
In 2020, Cox stated that her priorities if elected to the Senate would be to work for treaties with Indigenous Australians and to establish a national family violence strategy. Cox has also advocated for the use of Indigenous Australian customary law as a complement to the Australian legal system, as a way of improving  criminal justice outcomes for Indigenous people. Following the 2021 Australian Parliament House sexual misconduct allegations, she stated that the women's rights movement in Australia suffered from a lack of diversity.

Cox pursued the Morrison Government on its approval the Scarborough gas project, a project that will is expected to cause significant environmental harm, and generate 1.6 billion tonnes of emissions. In November 2021, Cox spoke out against the Morrison Government providing grants to frack the Beetaloo Basin. In 2022, Cox joined her Australian Greens colleagues in calling for a moratorium on all new coal and gas projects. Cox moved amendments on behalf of the Australian Greens to prohibit Export Finance Australia from investing in fossil fuel projects

Personal life
Cox has two daughters Ailish and Ciara with her ex-husband.

Cox experiences some hearing difficulties and uses a cochlear implant. In 2022, she was named World Hearing Day Ambassador by the Ear Science Institute Australia.

References

People from Kojonup, Western Australia
Australian Greens members of the Parliament of Australia
Members of the Australian Senate
Members of the Australian Senate for Western Australia
Women members of the Australian Senate
Australian police officers
Indigenous Australian politicians
Noongar people
Australian women's rights activists
Public servants of Western Australia
Living people
1976 births